Maxence Larrieu (born 27 October 1934 in Marseille) is a French classical flautist.

Career 
He studied flute from age 10 at the Marseille Conservatory of Music with Joseph Rampal, who was the father of Jean-Pierre Rampal. In 1958, Larrieu won the first prize at the International Geneva Competition. He has won 12 Grand Prix du Disque.

He has over 100 recordings to his credit, has won many awards and has recorded with orchestras from several countries including I Musici, l’Ensemble Instrumental, Chamber Orchestra of the Sarre, Orchestre de chambre Jean-François Paillard, and the Philharmonic of Turin.

He was the tutor of Massimo Mercelli.

“Maxence Larrieu" international flute competition 
Since 2007, he has held an annual flute competition.

References

External links
Naxos Biography of Maxence Larrieu
Home page

Musicians from Marseille
1934 births
French classical flautists
Living people